This is a list of exoplanets discovered before 2000.

For exoplanets detected only by radial velocity, the mass value is actually a lower limit. (See Minimum mass for more information)

Bodies previously considered as candidates
HD 114762 b was once considered as the first discovered exoplanet. Found in 1989 by a team led by David Latham, it is now known to be a red dwarf star.

Specific exoplanet lists

References

2000
exoplanets